Rosenborg Barracks (Danish: Livgardens Kaserne ved Rosenborg), one of two barracks of the Royal Danish Life Guard, is located next to Rosenborg Castle in Copenhagen, Denmark. Its address is Gothersgade but it has a long facade along Øster Voldgade.

History

Christian V's orangery

The building originates in King Christian V's pavilion which was built in 1670 with the assistance of architect Lambert van Haven. It was flanked by two long orangerie wings, one on each side, which ran parallel to the new Eastern Rampart which had been constructed in the 1650s. The central pavilion was often used for royal banquets, supplementing Christian IB's old pavilion which the king converted into a more intimate Hermitage.

The Laurel House

In 1709, the entire complex was interconnected to form one long building, known as the Orangerie. In 1743 the building was adapted into the Baroque style by Johan Cornelius Krieger and the name was changed to Laurierhuset (English: The Laurel House).

The Life Guards Barracks

When space became too sparse at Sølvgade Barracks, located on the other side of Rosenborg Gardens, Engineer Officer Ernst Peymann was charged with the task of converting the Laurel House into the new quarters of the Royal Life Guard. The work lasted from 1785 to 1786 and involved an extension of the building with an extra storey. In 1845 and 1930 further alterations were made.

Rosenborg Barracks today

In 1985, the headquarters of the Royal Life Guard moved to Høvelte Barracks, located between Allerød and Birkerød north of Copenhagen. Since then Rosenborg Barracks only houses guards on duty at Amalienborg Palace, Rosenborg Castle or Christiansborg Palace.

Royal Life Guards Museum
The buildings also contain a small museum dedicated to the history and artefacts of the Royal Life Guards, from their foundation in 1658  and to the present day. It was inaugurated on 12 January 1978.

See also
 Amalienborg Palace
 Old Artillery Barracks, Christianshavn

References

External links

 Official website
 Image of the Royal Orangery

Barracks in Copenhagen
Baroque architecture in Copenhagen
Residential buildings completed in 1786
Museums in Copenhagen
Military and war museums in Denmark